The Cathedral of San Carlos Borromeo (Spanish: Catedral de San Carlos Borromeo) is a Catholic church in Matanzas, Cuba. It is the seat of Manuel Hilario de Céspedes y García Menocal, the Bishop of the Roman Catholic Diocese of Matanzas.

History
The foundation stone of the church was laid on 12 October, 1693, and the first Mass was celebrated by the Bishop of Santiago, Diego Evelino Hurtado de Compostela. The original church was a simple structure constructed of fronds of the royal palm. It was soon destroyed in a storm and construction commenced on the present church. The building was finished in 1735 with all its facilities were in use by 1750.  It is a beautiful and elegant church with frescoes on the walls, ceilings and in the big dome. After years of neglect due to poor funding, the cathedral was carefully restored in 2017.

Location
The cathedral is in the neighborhood of Matanzas; the section of the city between the two rivers, the Yumuri and San Juan. A half block from the Parque de la Libertad (Freedom Park) and the Palacio Provincial (Provincial Palace). It is located on calle Jovellanos (Jovellanos Street), between Milanes and Independence streets.

Notes

Gallery

See also
Religion in Cuba

Roman Catholic cathedrals in Cuba 
Roman Catholic churches completed in 1735
Buildings and structures in Matanzas
Tourist attractions in Matanzas Province
18th-century Roman Catholic church buildings in Cuba